Entombed A.D. was a Swedish death metal band formed in 2014, composed of former members of Entombed after their breakup. They released their debut album, Back to the Front, the same year. The band's final lineup consisted of Olle Dahlstedt (drums), Nico Elgstrand (guitar), and Guilherme Miranda (guitar). They broke up after the death of singer Lars-Göran Petrov.

Band members 
 Lars-Göran Petrov – vocals (2014–2021; died 2021)
 Olle Dahlstedt – drums (2014–2021)
 Nico Elgstrand – guitar (2014–2021)
 Guilherme Miranda – guitar (2015–2021)
Live musicians
 Johan Jansson – guitar (2014–2015)
 Tobias Cristiansson – bass (2018–2019)
 Cauê De Marinis – bass (2019–2021)
Former members
 Victor Brandt – bass (2014–2018)

Discography

Studio albums

Music videos

References 

Swedish death metal musical groups
Musical groups established in 2014
Musical groups disestablished in 2021
Musical groups from Stockholm
Century Media Records artists
2014 establishments in Sweden
2021 disestablishments in Sweden